Daniel Perlsweig (May 21, 1926 – February 27, 2018) was an American jockey and trainer in the sport of Thoroughbred horse racing.

Background
When the war ended he embarked on what would be a ten-year career as jockey after which he turned to training Thoroughbreds.

Among his successful horses, Perlsweig is best known for training Lord Avie, the 1980 American Champion Two-Year-Old Colt. Lord Avie won the 1981 Florida Derby and was favored to win the 1981 Kentucky Derby until an injury kept him out of all three of the U. S. Triple Crown series.

In the early 1990s, Perlsweig founded Backstretch Appreciation Day to honor the many stable hands who work tirelessly behind the scene to look after horses, helping to secure their continuing success in racing.

In 1999, Perlsweig was voted the Dogwood Dominion Award as one of the unsung heroes of American horse racing.

References

1926 births
2018 deaths
United States Navy personnel of World War II
American jockeys
American horse trainers
Jewish American sportspeople
Sportspeople from Philadelphia
21st-century American Jews